Jayden Deslandes Sweeney (born 4 December 2001) is an English professional footballer who plays as a defender for Leyton Orient.

Playing career
Sweeney made his first-team debut for Leyton Orient in the FA Trophy on 15 December 2018, in a 4–0 win over Beaconsfield Town. He turned professional when he signed a two-year professional contract with the O's in June 2019.

In November 2019, he joined Isthmian League Premier Division club Bishop's Stortford on loan, and scored on his debut in the 2–2 draw at Merstham on 30 November. He made seven appearances in all competitions before returning to Orient in January 2020.

Sweeney made his league debut for Orient in the 3–0 defeat at Salford City on the last day of the 2020–21 season, as an 85th minute substitute for Conor Wilkinson. On 7 August, the first day of the 2021–22 season, he again came on as a late substitute at Salford City, this time for Connor Wood, in a 1–1 draw.

On 19 November 2021, Sweeney joined National League side Wealdstone on a one-month loan deal. He made his first appearance for the club the next day, in a 0–0 draw away to Wrexham. On 23 November 2021, in his second appearance for the club, Sweeney scored twice: opening the scoring and then netting the winner in a 3–2 victory against Dover Athletic. On 18 December 2021, Sweeney was recalled from his loan spell by parent club Leyton Orient.

On 5 March 2022, Sweeney joined Dartford on loan.

Career statistics

References

2001 births
Living people
English footballers
Association football defenders
Leyton Orient F.C. players
Wealdstone F.C. players
Bishop's Stortford F.C. players
Dartford F.C. players
English Football League players
Isthmian League players
National League (English football) players